Qardaha Sports Club is a Syrian football club based in Qardaha. It was founded in 1981. Their best achievement was reaching third place in 2002–03 Syrian Premier League season.

References

Qardaha
Association football clubs established in 1981
1981 establishments in Syria